Agonopterix nyctalopis is a moth of the family Depressariidae. It is found on the Comoros (Grand Comore).

This species has a wingspan of 23 mm. The head is ochreous-whitish sprinkled light grey, the forewings whitish-ochreous irregularly strigulated brownish.

References

Agonopterix
Moths described in 1930
Moths of Africa